{{DISPLAYTITLE:Delta1 Canis Minoris}}

Delta1 Canis Minoris, Latinized from δ1 Canis Minoris, is a solitary, yellow-white hued star in the constellation Canis Minor. It is faintly visible to the naked eye with an apparent visual magnitude of +5.25. Based upon an annual parallax shift of 4.29 mas as seen from Earth, this star is located roughly 760 light years from the Sun.

Houk and Swift (1999) list a stellar classification of F0 V for Delta1 Canis Minoris, indicating it is an F-type main-sequence star. However, Cowley et al. (1969) gave it a class of F0 III, which would suggest it is instead an evolved giant star. The spectrum displays a higher than solar metallicity – a term indicating the abundance of elements other than hydrogen and helium compared to the Sun. The star is spinning with a projected rotational velocity of 50 km/s and is radiating 319 times the Sun's luminosity from its photosphere at an effective temperature of 7,623 K.

References

External links

F-type main-sequence stars
Canis Minoris, Delta1
Canis Minor
Durchmusterung objects
Canis Minoris, 07
059881
036641
2880